Clark Bissell (September 7, 1782 – September 15, 1857) was the 34th governor of Connecticut. He served as an associate justice of the Connecticut Supreme Court from 1829 to 1839. He had previously served as a member of the Connecticut House of Representatives representing Norwalk and the Connecticut Senate representing the 12th District.

Early life 
Bissell was born in Lebanon, Connecticut on September 7, 1782. He studied at Yale College and graduated in 1806. He then studied law and was admitted to the bar in 1809. He married Sally Sherwood and they had six children.

Career 
Becoming a member of the Connecticut House of Representatives in 1829, Bissell was re-elected in 1841, and served in the Connecticut Senate from 1842 to 1843. He also succeeded Jeremiah G. Brainard as an associate judge of the Connecticut Supreme Court of Errors from 1829 to 1839.

Governor of Connecticut 
Bissell ran unsuccessfully for the Connecticut governorship in 1846. However, he was elected in 1847 as Governor of Connecticut and was re-elected in 1848. During his term, he advocated for reform in education, taxes, and liquor prohibition, however, only insignificant legislation was passed. He vetoed a resolution on divorce, and it was looked upon as sabotaging the legislature's power. Because of this, he was not renominated for the 1849 election.

After completing his term as the Governor, Bissell continued as a Professor of Law at Yale University, a position he was appointed to during his governorship. He also served in the Connecticut House of Representatives in 1850.

Death
Bissell died on September 15, 1857. He is interred at Norwalk Union Cemetery, Norwalk, Connecticut.

References

External links
 Sobel, Robert and John Raimo. Biographical Directory of the Governors of the United States, 1789-1978. Greenwood Press, 1988. 
The Political Graveyard
National Governors Association

1782 births
1857 deaths
Connecticut Whigs
Connecticut state senators
Governors of Connecticut
Justices of the Connecticut Supreme Court
Members of the Connecticut House of Representatives
Mayors of Norwalk, Connecticut
Yale College alumni
Yale University faculty
Whig Party state governors of the United States
19th-century American politicians
19th-century American judges